Marie Jakobaea of Baden-Sponheim (25 June 1507 – 16 November 1580) was a German noblewoman and duchess consort of Bavaria.

Life 
Marie was the daughter of Philip I, Margrave of Baden (1479–1533) and Countess Elisabeth (1483–1522), daughter of Philip, Elector Palatine and princess Margarete von Bayern-Landshut. Her paternal grandparents were Christopher I, Margrave of Baden-Baden and Ottilie of Katzenelnbogen.

On 5 October 1522 she married William IV, Duke of Bavaria (1493–1550), eldest son of Albert IV and his wife Kunigunde of Austria. They had four children:
 Theodor (1526–1534) 
 Albert V (1528–1579) ∞ 1546 Archduchess Anna of Austria (1528–1590)
 Wilhelm (1529–1530) 
 Mechthild of Bavaria (1532–1565) ∞ 1557 Margrave Philibert of Baden-Baden (1536–1569)

Bibliography 
 Hans and Marga Rall: Die Wittelsbacher – Von Otto I. bis Elisabeth I., Weltbild (1994) 

|-

|-

1507 births
1580 deaths
Duchesses of Bavaria
House of Wittelsbach
Burials at Munich Frauenkirche
Daughters of monarchs